Pagoda East Grama Niladhari Division is a Grama Niladhari Division of the Sri Jayawardanapura Kotte Divisional Secretariat of Colombo District of Western Province, Sri Lanka. It has Grama Niladhari Division Code 519C.

Jubilee Post, Nugegoda and Kotte Raja Maha Vihara are located within, nearby or associated with Pagoda East.

Pagoda East is a surrounded by the Mirihana South, Pitakotte West, Gangodavila South, Gangodavila East, Gangodavila North, Nugegoda, Pitakotte and Pagoda Grama Niladhari Divisions.

Demographics

Ethnicity 

The Pagoda East Grama Niladhari Division has a Sinhalese majority (91.1%). In comparison, the Sri Jayawardanapura Kotte Divisional Secretariat (which contains the Pagoda East Grama Niladhari Division) has a Sinhalese majority (84.8%)

Religion 

The Pagoda East Grama Niladhari Division has a Buddhist majority (83.0%). In comparison, the Sri Jayawardanapura Kotte Divisional Secretariat (which contains the Pagoda East Grama Niladhari Division) has a Buddhist majority (77.1%)

Gallery

References 

Grama Niladhari Divisions of Kotte Divisional Secretariat